The Order of Distinction or Order of Honour was an order of the Ottoman Empire founded by Sultan Abdulmejid I. It was a higher honor than the Order of Glory and given to reward merit and outstanding services. It was revived on 17 December 1878 by Sultan Abdul Hamid II. This was the highest order in the Ottoman Empire.

References

Distinction